MBL may refer to:

Education
 Marine Biological Laboratory, an international center for research and education in biology, biomedicine, and ecology
 Master of Business and Law, a two-year master's degree credential
National Security College (Israel)

Politics 
 Free Bolivia Movement (Spanish: Movimiento Bolivia Libre), a political party in Bolivia
 Free Brazil Movement (Portuguese: Movimento Brasil Livre), a libertarian Austrian-school inspired political movement in Brazil

Science 
 Mannan-binding lectin (or mannose-binding lectin), a protein capable of binding certain sugars and polysaccharides
 Many-body localization, a state of matter in which a local set of particles cannot reach thermal equilibrium
 Monoclonal B-cell lymphocytosis, a condition that resembles chronic lymphocytic leukemia (CLL)

Sport 
 Malaysian Basketball League, former name of the Malaysia National Basketball League, the pre-eminent men's basketball league in Malaysia
 Midwest Basketball League, a semi-professional men's basketball league which operates in the Midwestern United States

Transportation 
 Manistee County-Blacker Airport (IATA/FAA code MBL), an airport in the US state of Michigan
 Montclair-Boonton Line, a commuter rail line in North Jersey in the US state of New Jersey
 Montebello Bus Lines, a local transit agency serving the San Gabriel Valley in Southern California

Other uses
 Marie Byrd Land, region of West Antarctica
 Macquarie Bank Limited, name of the Macquarie Group (a publicly traded Australian financial-services corporation) prior to its restructuring in 2007